The Administration of Justice Act 1977 is an Act of the Parliament of the United Kingdom.

Part I - General

Section 6 - Temporary additional judges for Employment Appeal Tribunal
This section was repealed by section 159(3) of, and Schedule 17 to, the Employment Protection (Consolidation) Act 1978.

Section 8 - Oaths and affirmations
This section was repealed on 31 July 1978 by Part I of the Schedule to the Oaths Act 1978.

Part II - England and Wales

Section 9 - Appeals
This section was repealed by section 152(4) of, and Schedule 7 to, the Senior Courts Act 1981.

Section 10 - Appointment to office
This section was repealed by section 152(4) of, and Schedule 7 to, the Senior Courts Act 1981.

Section 23 - Jurisdiction of ancient courts
This section, with Schedule 4 and Part V of Schedule 5, implemented recommendations made, in the report "Jurisdiction of Certain Ancient Courts", by the Law Commission.  It provided that certain courts would cease to have jurisdiction to hear and determine legal proceedings, but could continue to sit and transact other business it could customarily transact. The courts affected were Courts Baron, Courts Leet, Customary Courts of the manor, Courts of Pie Poudre, Courts of the Staple, Courts of the clerks of the markets (or clerk of the market), Hundred Courts, Law Days, Views of Frankpledge, Common law (or Sheriffs’) county courts as known before the passing of the County Courts Act 1846, The Basingstoke Court of Ancient Demesne, The Coventry Court of Orphans, The Great Grimsby Foreign Court, The King’s Lynn Court of Tolbooth, In the City of London, the Court of Husting and the Sheriffs’ Courts for the Poultry Compter and the Giltspur Street Compter, The Macclesfield Court of Portmote, The Maidstone Court of Conservancy, The Melcombe Regis Court of Husting, The Newcastle upon Tyne Courts of Conscience or Requests and Conservancy, The Norwich Court of Mayoralty, The Peterborough Dean and Chapter’s Court of Common Pleas, The Ramsey (Cambridgeshire) Court of Pleas, The Ripon Court Military, The Ripon Dean and Chapter’s Canon Fee Court, The St. Albans Court of Requests, The Court of the Hundred, Manor and Borough of Tiverton, The York Courts of Husting, Guildhall and Conservancy, The Ancient Prescriptive Court of Wells, The Cheney (or Cheyney) Court of the Bishop of Winchester.

It also limited the Court of the Chancellor or Vice-Chancellor of Oxford University and the Cambridge University Chancellor’s Court to jurisdiction under the statutes of those Universities.

Section 26
From 1 February 1978, the provisions of section 26(2) relating to mortgage cautions, subject to any necessary modification, apply also to sub-mortgage cautions. The Land Registration Rules 1977 (Sl 1977/2089) are consequential on section 26.

Part III - Other provisions

Section 32 - Citation etc
The following orders were made under section 32(6):
The Administration of Justice Act 1977 (Commencement No. 1) Order 1977 (SI 1977/1405)
The Administration of Justice Act 1977 (Commencement No. 2) Order 1977 (SI 1977/1490) (C 53)
The Administration of Justice Act 1977 (Commencement No. 3) Order 1977 (SI 1977/1589)
The Administration of Justice Act 1977 (Commencement No. 4) Order 1977 (SI 1977/2202)
The Administration of Justice Act 1977 (Commencement No. 5) Order 1978 (SI 1978/810). Made on 6 June 1978.
The Administration of Justice Act 1977 (Commencement No. 6) Order 1979 (SI 1979/972) (C 27)
The Administration of Justice Act 1977 (Commencement No. 7) Order 1980 (SI 1980/1981)

References
Halsbury's Statutes, Third Edition. Volume 47. Continuation Volume 1977. Google Books. 2008 Reissue. Volume 19(3). Google Books
Current Law Statutes Annotated 1977. Sweet & Maxwell. 1977. Google Books
Robert E Megarry and H W R Wade. The Law of Real Property. Fifth Edition. Stevens and Sons Limited. London. 1984. Pages 36, 221, 226, 227 and 550. Stuart Bridge and Martin J Dixon (eds). Eighth Edition. Sweet & Maxwell. 2012. Paragraphs 2-029, 4-110 and 4-111. p ccxxxix.
Cheshire and Burn's Modern Law of Real Property. Eighteenth Edition. Oxford University Press. Pages 1080 and 1081. p xxiii
A G Guest (ed). Chitty on Contracts. Twenty-Seventh Edition. Sweet & Maxwell. London. 1994. Volume 2 (Specific Contracts) (Common Law Library No 2). Paragraphs 33-104 and 33-173.
Sealy and Milman. Annotated Guide to the Insolvency Legislation 2011. Fourteenth Edition. Sweet & Maxwell. p 275
Alec Samuels, "The Administration of Justice Act 1977" (1977) 127 New Law Journal 1079
"Ancient courts" (1978) 122 Solicitors Journal 570; "Recent revisions" (1978) 122 Solicitors Journal 677 
(1977) 121 Solicitors Journal 580, 636, 667, 679, 683 and 702
"County Court Rules: Amendment" (1978) 122 Solicitors Journal 52 and 227 ; (1978) 97 Law Notes 44 ; "County Courts County Court (Amendment No 4) Rules 1977" (1979) 128 New Law Journal 61 
"Registered Land", Journal of the Institute of Bankers, vols 97 to 100, p 28 Google Books
(1978) 97 Law Notes 45 and 186; (1979) 128 New Law Journal 11, 161, 607, 856; (1978) 142 Justice of the Peace 553

External links
The Administration of Justice Act 1977, as amended from the National Archives.
The Administration of Justice Act 1977, as originally enacted from the National Archives.

United Kingdom Acts of Parliament 1977